Valeriano Muti (died 19 March 1610) was a Roman Catholic prelate who served as Bishop of Città di Castello (1602–1610), Apostolic Nuncio to Naples (1609–1610), and Bishop of Bitetto (1599–1602).

Biography
On 5 July 1599, Valeriano Muti was appointed during the papacy of Pope Clement VIII as Bishop of Bitetto.
On 18 July 1599, he was consecrated bishop by Camillo Borghese, Cardinal-Priest of Santi Giovanni e Paolo, with Giovanni Camerota, Bishop of Bova, and Leonardus Roselli, Bishop of Vulturara e Montecorvino, serving as co-consecrators.
On 15 November 1602, he was appointed during the papacy of Pope Clement VIII as Bishop of Città di Castello.
On 12 January 1609, he was appointed during the papacy of Pope Paul V as Apostolic Nuncio to Naples.
He served as Bishop of Città di Castello until his death on 19 March 1610.

Episcopal succession
While bishop, he was the principal co-consecrator of:

References

External links and additional sources
 (for Chronology of Bishops) 
 (for Chronology of Bishops) 
 (for Chronology of Bishops) 
 (for Chronology of Bishops) 
 (for Chronology of Bishops) 

16th-century Italian Roman Catholic bishops
17th-century Italian Roman Catholic bishops
Bishops appointed by Pope Clement VIII
Bishops appointed by Pope Paul V
1610 deaths